Hurlstone Park is a suburb in the Inner West of Sydney, New South Wales, Australia. Hurlstone Park is located nine kilometres south-west of the Sydney central business district and is mostly in the local government area of the City of Canterbury-Bankstown, and partly in the Inner West Council. The suburb is bounded by: the Cooks River to the south, Garnet Street to the east, New Canterbury Road to the north, Canterbury Road to the north-west, and Church Street to the west.

History
Hurlstone Park was first known as 'Wattle Hill' and then 'Fernhill'. After the Postmaster-General's Department refused to open a post office called Fernhill, a 1910 referendum chose the name 'Hurlstone', after the nearby Hurlstone College. John Kinloch founded the college in 1878, on the site of present-day Trinity Grammar School and named it after his mother's maiden name, which was Helen Hurlstone. The college moved to a new site, now known as Hurlstone Agricultural High School. The 'Park' was added at the request of the Railways Department, to avoid confusion with the New South Wales town of Hillston.

Transport

Hurlstone Park railway station is a Sydney Trains station (located 8.8 km from Central station) on the Bankstown line.

Transit Systems operate the following bus services in Hurlstone Park: 444; 445 (to Balmain East ferry wharf via Dulwich Hill, Petersham Lilyfield, Leichhardt and Rozelle), 428 (to the city via Canterbury, Dulwich Hill, Petersham, Marrickville and Newtown) and L28 routes which run along the Canterbury Road and New Canterbury Road boundary, and the 418 (to Burwood via Ashfield, and to Bondi Junction via Dulwich Hill, Marrickville, Sydenham, St Peters, Alexandria, Mascot, Rosebery, Eastlakes, Kingsford, Randwick and Queens Park), and 406 (to Five Dock via Ashfield) routes which pass through the suburb (along Crinan Street with a bus stop directly outside the railway station).

Commercial area

There is a group of shops around Hurlstone Park Station: along Crinan Street, the southern end of Duntroon Street and Floss Street. There are also commercial areas along Canterbury Road and New Canterbury Road. There is an active, local Chamber of Commerce: Canterbury-Hurlstone Park Chamber of Commerce.

The rest of the commercially used land in Hurlstone Park is made up of various shops, ranging from fast food outlets and milk bars to a couple of petrol stations. Hurlstone Park also has three childcare centres. Specific to Hurlstone Park village are the following businesses: three cafés, a seven-day supermarket, newsagent, lawyer, accountants, dry cleaner, laundry service, post office which opened in 1911, doctor's surgery, dentist, shoe repair, real estate agent, naturopath, seven-day bottle shop, convenience store, three hairdressers, an Asian grocery store and two ATMs (one Commonwealth Bank and one Citibank). The locals and shop-owners in Hurlstone Park are well-acquainted. The local shoemaker still crafts bespoke shoes, and sells local honey.

Pubs and clubs

Hurlstone Park contains the following clubs and pubs:
The Canterbury Hurlstone Park RSL club, located on the corner of Canterbury Road and Crinan Street, is an entertainment venue that attracts many Australian and international performers. The club also contains a war memorial chapel.
The Hurlstone Park Bowling & Recreation Club. Located in Marcia street. This club has been closed down by the council. This building has been demolished, and turned into a green-space.
The Hurlstone Park Hotel, located on the corner of New Canterbury road and Duntroon street, is also known as "Grumpy's". Now demolished to build Units above a refurbished Hotel on the same site.
The Sydney Olympic Sporting Club was located at 64 Tennent Parade but was demolished in October 2010.

Houses

 
Hurlstone Park has a range of period homes. It is generally a low-rise residential area with maintained family homes and larger back-yards, with tree-lined streets, and small parks and playgrounds. Older shop façades, some with original features make up the small shopping strip. There is an increasing number of high-rise units in the suburb mostly along Canterbury and New Canterbury Roads. Some of the suburb is an oasis of heritage, with a village atmosphere valued by the residents it is potentially threatened by changes to zoning and increased high-rise development.

Parks and reserves

Hurlstone Park includes the following parks and reserves:
Ewen Park. Located along the Cooks river (in the middle of the southern end of the suburb). It is the largest individual park in the suburb and contains two playing fields that are home to the Hurlstone Park Wanderers soccer club. The fields in Ewen park are also used for cricket in summer.
Warwick Reserve. Located at the intersection of Church and Canberra streets in the south-west corner of the suburb.
Euston Reserve. Located at the intersection of Euston and Floss streets, the reserve contains a war memorial.
Sawyer Reserve. Located at the intersection of Dunstaffenage street and Foord avenue, and at the end of the cul-de-sac of Kilbride St.
Hurlstone Memorial Reserve. A small reserve located next to the Hurlstone Park Bowling Club (along Crinan street).
Burnett Street Reserve. The reserve splits Burnett street into two sections.
Dick Poole Reserve. A small reserve that joins the end of Barre street with the point where Wallace avenue and Wallace lane meet.
Moser Reserve. A small reserve on the south side of the railway line in Keir Avenue.
Fernhill Street Reserve. A small reserve near the northern end of Fernhill street (with lane access to Barton avenue).
Dunkeld Reserve. A small reserve near the western edge of the suburb (in Dunkeld avenue).
A small reserve at the intersection of Garnet street and Tennent parade (in the south-east corner of the suburb). Located next to the 14th hole of Marrickville golf course, the unnamed reserve contains a cricket practice net and a practice goal post (for soccer and rugby).
A small reserve on the corner of Crinan and Melford streets. The unnamed reserve is a small grassed area that was opened to the public following the demolition of a single house.
A green belt along the entire southern border of the suburb. The belt follows the Cooks River and encompasses Ewen park. The Botany Bay cycle way extends for 23 km (with Hurlstone Park being approximately one third of the way from Botany Bay to Ryde). The western part of the belt contains a constructed rectangular inlet of water named Boat Harbour. The eastern part of the belt constitutes part of the 13th and 14th holes of Marrickville Golf Course. There are three-foot bridges that cross the Cooks River to the south of the belt: One bridge crosses from the end of Sugar House Road (off Hutton Street), a second bridge crosses from the end of Foord Avenue, and the third bridge crosses near the intersection of Tennent Parade and Burnett Street.

Churches and religion
According to the 2016 census, the top responses for religious affiliation in Hurlstone Park were No Religion 30.0%, Catholic 29.0%, Eastern Orthodox 11.2%, Not stated 9.2% and Anglican 5.1%.

The suburb contains the following religious establishments:
St Stephen Greek Orthodox Archdiocese of Australia. Located at 650 New Canterbury road.
Hurlstone Park Uniting Church. Located at 8 Melford street, the church provides services in English and Tongan.
Sydney Revival Fellowship Inc. Located at 83 Dunstaffenage St.
 Siddha Yoga Ashram. Located at 50 Garnet Street.
Hurlstone Park Vietnamese Baptist Church. Technically, the location of the church (corner of Queen and Griffiths streets) is in the neighbouring suburb of Ashfield (but only by 180 metres).

Schools

Only one school is located in Hurlstone Park. The Edgeware School is an alternative Department of Education facility, mainly for year 9 to 12 students who have been unsuccessful in mainstream schools. It is located in Burnett street (just off Tennent parade).

Demographics
At the 2016 census, there were 4,692 residents in Hurlstone Park.

 57.2% of people were born in Australia. The next most common countries of birth were Greece 4.5%, China 3.1%, Lebanon 2.7%, England 2.4% and Italy 2.3%.  5

 4.9% of people spoke only English at home. Other languages spoken at home included Greek 9.4%, Arabic 5.1%, Mandarin 3.1%, Italian 3.1% and Portuguese 2.9%. 

 The most common ancestries were English 16.1%, Australian 14.7%, Irish 8.9%, Greek 8.4% and Chinese 5.3%.

Notable people
 Jock Gibson, fencer
 Jock Livingston, cricketer
 Nicholas Papademetriou, actor

References

External links

  [CC-By-SA]

Suburbs of Sydney
Inner West Council
City of Canterbury-Bankstown